Woven fabric is any textile formed by weaving. Woven fabrics are often created on a loom, and made of many threads woven on a warp and a weft. Technically, a woven fabric is any fabric made by interlacing two or more threads at right angles to one another. Woven fabrics can be made of both natural and synthetic fibres, and are often made from a mixture of both. E.g. 100% Cotton or 80% Cotton & 20% polyester. 60% spandex and 40% cotton could also be woven together. Woven fabric is typically used in clothing, garments, for decoration, furniture or covering purposes such as carpets. In the Midwest, it is popular to have woven wicker furniture in sitting areas such as a patio or a dining room.

Qualities
Woven fabrics only stretch diagonally on the bias directions (between the warp and weft directions), unless the threads used are elastic. Woven fabric cloth usually frays at the edges, unless techniques are used to counter it, such as the use of pinking shears or hemming. Different companies use textiles differently to create products. Shirts of a woven fabric may be available somewhere but not seen in a different store. 

Fabrics that are woven do not stretch as easily as knitted fabrics, which can make them advantageous for many uses.

Closely woven fabric is more durable and keeps it shape better, a loosely woven fabric will be the opposite. Woven fabric is constructed with two threads, horizontal and vertical. The horizontal threads are called the weft and the vertical threads are called the warp. The warp and weft can be woven together in different variations of the three basic weaves; plain, twill and satin. These varieties can be shaped into dresses, tops, and even coats, in some instances.

See also
Knitted fabric
Nonwoven fabric

References

External links